Marcel Granollers and Horacio Zeballos were the defending champions, when the event was last held in 2020, but lost to Jamie Murray and Bruno Soares in the semifinals.

Simone Bolelli and Fabio Fognini won the title, defeating Murray and Soares in the final, 7–5, 6–7(2–7), [10–6].

Seeds

Draw

Draw

Qualifying

Seeds

Qualifiers
  Pablo Andújar /  Pedro Martínez

Qualifying draw

References

External links
 Main draw
 Qualifying draw

Rio Open - Doubles
Rio Open
Rio Open